Abdi Qays was born in Hargeisa in 1940 under the British Somaliland protectorate was the only poet in Somali language to be a musician, poet, and playwright.

Abdi Aadan Haad earned his nickname 'Abdi Qays' after playing the part of Qays Ibn al-Mulawwah in the Arabic play Layla and Majnun in Djibouti in the early 1960s.

Abdi Qays served a total of 12 years in prison because of the political messages against the Siad Barre regime in his songwriting and poetry. His served this from approximately 1976 to 1982, then again from 1984 to 1988. During the peak of his career, he spent a lot of time in Djibouti to avoid fame and also prison time.

Abdi Qays collaborated with Khadra Daahir, the queen vocalist of the Somali-speaking world. Abdi Qays wrote most of the duo's love songs and poems and sometimes played the Oud.

He currently lives in Hargeisa, Somaliland.

Poetry 
Abdi Qays and Hadraawi started the Dalaay Poem in the late 1970s. The poem speaks out against Siad Barre regime. Here is an excerpt:
 
First, I am coming to see you
Second, I am carrying something with me
Be patient always
Oh! "Saharla" don't be impatient!

The lyrics of Abdi Qeys' rebuttal is:

Don't come! Go back
Keep whatever you are carrying with you
I am impatient
"Soobaan" is saying!
The world has passed
The stage when you have
To wait for things to happen.

And love and ritual songs such as, "Awliyo allaay" and "Curadadii aan dhalaay".

References

1940 births
Living people
Somaliland poets
People from Hargeisa
20th-century poets